Anthony Wilding defeated Ernie Parker 6–1, 7–5, 6–2 in the final to win the men's singles tennis title at the 1909 Australasian Championships. It was Wilding's second Australasian singles title after 1906. The event was held on the grass courts of the Zoological Gardens in Perth.

Draw

Key
 Q = Qualifier
 WC = Wild card
 LL = Lucky loser
 r = Retired

References

External links
  Grand Slam Tennis Archive – Australasian Open 1909
 

1909 in Australian tennis
Men's Singles